Antena Stars is a Romanian TV channel. It started broadcasting on 9 April 2007 and it is a part of the Intact group, owned by the family of the Romanian businessman and politician Dan Voiculescu.

On 16 December 2013, at 19:02 EET, the television station changed its name from Antena 2 to Antena Stars.

References

External links
 AntenaStars.ro

Television channels and stations established in 2007
Television stations in Romania